The 2010 Kawasaki Frontale season was their sixth consecutive season in J.League 1, the top division of football in Japan.

Competitions

Player statistics

Other pages
 J. League official site

Kawasaki Frontale
Kawasaki Frontale seasons